, also known as , was the seventh shōgun of the Kamakura shogunate of Japan. He was the nominal ruler controlled by the Hōjō clan regents.

Prince Koreyasu was the son of Prince Munetaka who was the sixth shōgun.

 26 August 1266 (Bun'ei 3, 24th day of the 7th month): Koreyasu was installed as the 7th shōgun at the age of two when his father was deposed.
 17 July 1287 (Kōan 10, 6th day of the 6th month): The shōgun was given the offices of Chūnagon and Udaijin in the hierarchy of the Imperial court.
 29 September 1289 (Shōō 2, 14th day of the 9th month): A revolt led by Hōjō Sadatoki (Sagami-no-Kami) caused Koreyasu to flee to Kyoto.

At age 25, the deposed shōgun became a Buddhist monk. His priestly name was Ono-no miya.

Family
 Father: Prince Munetaka
 Mother: Konoe Saiko (b. 1241)
 Wife: unknown
 Children:
 Prince Hitozumi
 a daughter married Prince Hisaaki (d. 1306)
 Prince Yasutada
 Prince Hitokiyo (1291–1302)
 Prince Hitotada
 Prince Hisazumi
 Adopted son: Prince Hisaaki

Eras of Koreyasu's bakufu
The years in which Koreyasu is shogun are more specifically identified by more than one era name or nengō.
 Bun'ei (1264–1275)
 Kenji (1275–1278)
 Kōan (1278–1288)
 Shōō (1288–1293)

Notes

References
 Nussbaum, Louis-Frédéric and Käthe Roth. (2005).  Japan encyclopedia. Cambridge: Harvard University Press. ;  OCLC 58053128
 Titsingh, Isaac. (1834). Nihon Ōdai Ichiran; ou,  Annales des empereurs du Japon. Paris: Royal Asiatic Society, Oriental Translation Fund of Great Britain and Ireland. OCLC 5850691.

1264 births
1326 deaths
13th-century Japanese people
14th-century Japanese people
13th-century shōguns
Japanese princes
Kamakura shōguns
People from Kamakura